Krouzian-Zekarian-Vasbouragan Armenian School is a bi-lingual private K-8 school in San Francisco, California.

The school is the only Armenian school in the San Francisco Bay Area. St. Gregory the Illuminator Armenian Apostolic Church established it in 1980. The primary school opened with grades preschool through one in September; the building construction had finished the previous month. Initially 34 children were enrolled as students. From August 1985 until 1986 Phase II, which added a second floor, was under construction. Hratch Tarpinian donated the funds used to establish the middle school component, called Vasbouragan Middle School.  the school had 122 students, with 35 of them in preschool.

One of the co-founders was Krikor Krouzian.

Victim of Global Attacks 
KZV became a target for hate crimes as a part of numerous global attacks on Armenians. On July 24, 2020, the Armenian school was vandalized, reported to be incited by the Azerbaijani government. The school's alumni turned this hate crime into an opportunity for unity and stood together. They raised their flag high, danced for peace and covered the front of the school with a banner that read, "Armenians stand against hate."

Two months after it was vandalized, on September 19, 2020, the school's sign was shot at. Officers have been patrolling the area since the anti-Armenian graffiti, but no suspects were located and there were no injuries reported.

References

External links

 

Education in San Francisco
Armenian-American culture in California
Armenian-American private schools
Private K–8 schools in California
1980 establishments in California
Educational institutions established in 1980